The Coates-Goshen was an American automobile produced from 1908 until 1910 by Joseph Saunders Coates in Goshen, New York. The cars had four-cylinder engines of 25-hp and 32-hp. In 1910, larger 45 and 60-hp models were added. Production stopped when the factory burned down after about 30 cars had been made.

The Coates-Goshen factory still stands and was formerly Healey Brothers Chevrolet-Buick and now the corporate offices of Healey Brothers Inc.  It retains its original look.

References
David Burgess Wise, The New Illustrated Encyclopedia of Automobiles.

Defunct motor vehicle manufacturers of the United States
Motor vehicle manufacturers based in New York (state)
Defunct companies based in New York (state)